Trás os Montes is a settlement in the northern part of the island of Santiago, Cape Verde. In 2010 its population was 464. It is situated 4 km northeast of Tarrafal.

References

Villages and settlements in Santiago, Cape Verde
Tarrafal Municipality